Aeneolamia is a genus of Cicadomorpha in the froghopper family (Cercopidae). It is found mostly throughout Central America.

It consists of 8 species:

 Aeneolamia albofasciata
 Aeneolamia colon
 Aeneolamia contigua
 Aeneolamia flavilatera
 Aeneolamia lepidior
 Aeneolamia reducta
 Aeneolamia sanguiniplaga
 Aeneolamia varia

References 

Cercopidae
Hemiptera of Central America